For What It’s Worth is the tenth book for children by Janet Tashjian.  It is a young adult novel published by Henry Holt and Company.  The title is taken from the 1967 Buffalo Springfield song of the same name.

Quinn is a 14-year-old boy growing up in Laurel Canyon in 1971, the center of the Southern California music scene.  He starts a band, finally gets a girlfriend, and continues to add to his record collection until he meets a draft dodger and his perfect world falls apart.  Through his Ouija board, he contacts Club 27 – the spirits of Janis Joplin, Jimi Hendrix, and Jim Morrison.  The rock icons give him bad advice Quinn struggles to understand.

References 

 Kirkusreviews.com: For What It's Worth review
Macmillan.com: author Janet Tashjian

2012 American novels
Novels by Janet Tashjian
Los Angeles in fiction
Laurel Canyon, Los Angeles
Henry Holt and Company books